Edward "Eddie" Battye (born 30 December 1991) is an English rugby league footballer who plays as a  for Wakefield Trinity in the Betfred Super League.

He has previously played for the Sheffield Eagles over two separate spells in the Championship, the Villeneuve Leopards in the Elite One Championship and the London Broncos in the Championship and the Super League. Battye has also spent time on loan from the Broncos at Wakefield in the Super League.

Background
Battye was born in England. He was brought up on a buffalo farm in Penistone, South Yorkshire.

Career

Sheffield Eagles
Battye played junior rugby league for Hillsborough Hawks and signed with the Sheffield Eagles and made his Championship debut in 2011.

After a spell in France playing for Villeneuve Leopards he returned to the Eagles and became a regular, featuring in their Championship winning team in 2013. He joined London Broncos in 2016.

In 2017, Battye was kept out of rugby league for four months due to a knee injury.

London Broncos
He put in a man of the match performance in the first game of the 2018 Qualifiers against Widnes at The Halton stadium. His team London Broncos came out 20-21 winners in an enthralling game at The Halton stadium in Widnes.

Battye put in an outstanding performance and contributed a try in an outstanding team effort to defeat Wigan in an 18-16 thriller on 9 March 2019.

Wakefield Trinity
On 24 January 2021, it was reported that he had signed for Wakefield Trinity in the Super League.

References

External links

London Broncos profile
Sheffield Eagles profile
SL profile

1991 births
Living people
English rugby league players
London Broncos players
Place of birth missing (living people)
Rugby league players from Yorkshire
Rugby league props
Sheffield Eagles players
Villeneuve Leopards players
Wakefield Trinity players